Goat Peak is a  summit located in the Pemberton Valley of British Columbia, Canada.

Description

Precipitation runoff from the mountain's slopes drains south into Wolverine Creek and west into Mowich Creek which are both tributaries of the Lillooet River; and north to Hurley River. The mountain is on unceded territory of the Lil'wat and N'Quatqua, which is an important spiritual, cultural and food gathering area. The surrounding area is habitat for the South Chilcotin grizzly bear, black bear, mountain goat, wolverine, wolf, and deer. The mountain's toponym was officially adopted December 31, 1970, by the Geographical Names Board of Canada. The landform was originally identified as "Goat Mountain" in 1936 by the Canadian Alpine Journal.

Climate
Based on the Köppen climate classification, Goat Peak is located in a subarctic climate zone of western North America. Most weather fronts originate in the Pacific Ocean, and travel east toward the Coast Mountains where they are forced upward by the range (Orographic lift), causing them to drop their moisture in the form of rain or snowfall. As a result, the Coast Mountains experience high precipitation, especially during the winter months in the form of snowfall. Winter temperatures can drop below −20 °C with wind chill factors below −30 °C. This climate supports unnamed glaciers on the north and northeast slopes. The months July through September offer the most favorable weather for viewing or climbing Goat Peak.

See also
 
 Geography of British Columbia

References

External links
 Weather: Goat Peak 

Two-thousanders of British Columbia
Pacific Ranges
Lillooet Land District
Coast Mountains
Pemberton Valley